Konotopa may refer to the following places:
Konotopa, Mława County in Masovian Voivodeship (east-central Poland)
Konotopa, Warsaw West County in Masovian Voivodeship (east-central Poland)
Konotopa, Podlaskie Voivodeship (north-east Poland)